Jorethang Loop Hydroelectric project is a , run-of-the-river hydroelectric power station on the Rangit river in South Sikkim district of Sikkim state in India. The dam is located near village Piple and power station is located about 13 km downstream near village Majhitar. Dans Energy Private Limited was awarded contract for construction of the project. The project was officially inaugurated on 29 October 2015. The project was built at a cost of Rs 1,182 crores.

Powerhouse 
Water is diverted from barrage through 6.8 km long head race tunnel, through  a  surge shaft of 25 m dia. and pressure shaft to power house near village Majitar. The powerhouse has 2 x 48.75 MW vertical shaft type Francis turbines that generate 2x48 MW power. The water flow is discharged back into Rangit river through a 40m tall race channel. With installed capacity is of 96 MW project is expected to generate approximately 444.03 GWh per annum.

Power transmission
The electricity generated is connected to switchyard near powerhouse and evacuated through double circuit 220 kV transmission line to the New Melli 220KV switching substation. New Melli sub station is located about 10 km away from powerhouse and connected to Eastern Regional Grid.

See also 

 Rangit Hydroelectric Power Project Stage III – situated upstream

References

External links 

 Jorethang Loop HEP

Dams in Sikkim
Hydroelectric power stations in Sikkim
2015 establishments in Sikkim